Amruthavarshini is a 1997 Indian Kannada-language romantic drama film written, photographed and directed by Dinesh Baboo. It stars Ramesh Aravind, Suhasini and Sharath Babu, with Nivedita Jain appearing in a cameo role. It features Ramesh Arvind playing a negative role for which he was widely praised. The film revolves around the three central characters of a husband (Sharath), wife (Suhasini) and a friend (Ramesh) who intrudes into the couple's life and turns their life into tragic events.

The film was produced by Bharathi Devi under the banner Chinni Chitra. Upon release, the film was declared a musical blockbuster hit with all the songs of the soundtrack composed by Deva becoming evergreen hits. The songs of the film continue to be favorites among the Kannada audience. The film was one of the highest grossers at the box-office for the year 1997. The film was awarded with multiple State Awards and Filmfare Awards, particularly for the story and acting.

The film was subsequently dubbed in Telugu with same title name and in Tamil as Uyirinum Melaaga. In Malayalam, the film was remade as Mazhavillu (1999) by the same director.

Plot
Hemanth and Veena are a happily married couple with Hemanth working for an advertisement firm. One day, Abhishek Bharadwaj, a poet and Hemanth's childhood friend, visits them. Abhishek is depressed due to the death of his girlfriend, Shruti due to cancer. Shruthi had made Abhishek promise that he will marry another girl after her death. Abhishek becomes obsessed with Veena as she has a strong resemblance to Shruthi. Hemanth learns of this but doesn't reveal it to Veena. He takes Abhishek to a cliff and ask him to change his mind and return home but Abhishek tries to kill him by letting their jeep hit him which causes him to fall off the cliff. Abhishek does not try to save him even though he could have, when Hemanth was hanging off the cliff. Hemanth's automatic camera captures the whole episode. When Veena accidentally sees those pictures, she understands what really happened that day. She pretends to have moved on and suggests that she is ready to share her life with Abhishek. She asks him to take her to the cliff where Hemanth died as it was his long cherished dream to take photos from the cliff. She confronts him, revealing that she knows what had happened and shows him the pictures of that day. She then kills her self by leaping from the cliff, in front of Abhishek, as a revenge.

Cast
 Ramesh Aravind as Abhishek Bharadwaj
 Suhasini as Veena Hemanth
 Sharath Babu as Hemanth
 Tara as Vimala
 Ramakrishna as Janakiram
 Nivedita Jain in a guest appearance as Shruthi
 Sathyapriya as Abhi's mother
 Kunigal Nagabhushan as Ranganna
 Vinayak Joshi as Kodaikanal Tourist Guide Peter

Soundtrack

Deva composed the music for the film and the soundtracks, with lyrics of the soundtracks penned by K. Kalyan. The album has nine soundtracks. The male version of the song "Tunturu" appears for only 30 seconds in the movie — after climax during the end credits.

Awards and honors
 It won the Arya Bhata Award and was also screened at the Indian Panorama Festival
 Filmfare Award for Best Film – Kannada 1997 - B. Jayashree Devi
 Filmfare Award for Best Actor – Kannada 1997 - Ramesh Aravind
 Filmfare Award for Best Music Director – Kannada 1997 - Deva
 Karnataka State Film Award for Best Screenplay
 Karnataka State Film Award for Best Editor - Kemparaj
 Screen Award for Best Actress (Kannada) – Suhasini Maniratnam

References

External links
 
 

1990s Kannada-language films
1997 films
Films scored by Deva (composer)
Kannada films remade in other languages
1997 romantic drama films
Indian romantic drama films
Films directed by Dinesh Baboo